This is the calendar for any Old Style common year starting on Tuesday, March 25. The Old Style calendar ended the following March, on March 24.
Examples: Julian year 1707, 1813 or 1903 (see bottom tables).

A common year is a year with 365 days, in other words, not a leap year, which has 366.

 Previous year (common)   Next year (common)
 Previous year (leap)     Next year (leap)

References

Old Style common years
Julian calendar